Ju Hye-ri (born 21 February 1991) is a South Korean cross-country skier. She competed in the 2018 Winter Olympics.

References

1991 births
Living people
Cross-country skiers at the 2018 Winter Olympics
South Korean female cross-country skiers
Olympic cross-country skiers of South Korea
Cross-country skiers at the 2017 Asian Winter Games
Asian Games medalists in cross-country skiing
Asian Games bronze medalists for South Korea
Medalists at the 2017 Asian Winter Games
21st-century South Korean women